Tarun Saikia (Assamese: তৰুণ শইকীয়া) is a mountaineer and the first climber from Assam to scale Mount Everest. He reached its summit on 18 May 2013. A few days later, on 24 May, another Assamese, Manish Kumar Deka, also conquered Everest. Manipur mountaineering and trekking association had organised the expedition under the leadership of Dr L Surjit Singh. In the team there were thirteen members, of which eleven summited successfully.

About Tarun Saikia
Tarun Saikia comes from Guwahati. He is a resident of Forest Gate, Noonmati (in Guwahati). His parents are (late) Atul Saikia and Charu Saikia.

At the age of 37, Tarun Saikia reached the highest peak on 18 May 2013. The expedition was sponsored by the North Eastern Council and the Manipur Government. He loved adventure sports since his schooldays and he began mountaineering with an adventure club at Gauhati College in 1989. The Govt. of Assam had announced a cash award of Rs. 20 Lakhs for his feat.

See also
Indian summiters of Mount Everest - Year wise
List of Mount Everest summiters by number of times to the summit
List of Mount Everest records of India
List of Mount Everest records

References

Indian summiters of Mount Everest
Sportspeople from Assam
Indian mountain climbers